Zərbəli (also, Zarbaly) is a village and municipality in the Jalilabad Rayon of Azerbaijan.  It has a population of 388. The estimate terrain elevation above sea level is 148 meters.

References 

Populated places in Jalilabad District (Azerbaijan)